South Park Street Cemetery, formerly known as the ‘Great Christian Burial Ground’, was one of the earliest non-church cemeteries in the world. The cemetery houses numerous graves and monuments belonging to British soldiers, administrators, and their families. It is also the final resting place of several prominent personalities, including Henry Louis Vivian Derozio and Sir William Jones. It is located on Mother Teresa Sarani (also known as Park Street), Central Kolkata, India.

History

The burial ground, along with a new road leading to it, known as the Burial Ground Road, was built in 1767. The cemetery and the road were later renamed Park Street after a private deer park established by Sir Elijah Impey. By the year 1785, the cemetery had been extended on the northern side of Park Street. Even though a marble plaque at the cemetery gate reads “South Park Street, Opened:1767, Closed:1790”, the burials continued in the 1830s, until a vast new cemetery was opened to the east of the Lower Circular Road.

After the independence of India, the Park Street cemeteries were decided to be leveled off, as funding for the colonial civil cemeteries were withdrawn. This decision met with resistance from Anglo-Indian citizens of Calcutta. In 1953, the North Park Street Cemetery was decided to be demolished, and the income obtained by leasing the land was used to upkeep the South Park Street Cemetery. In the late 1970s, the cemetery came under the purview of the Association for the Preservation of Historical Cemeteries in India (APHCI) and the Christian Burial Board.

In 1984, Apeejay Trust attempted to demolish the cemetery in order to build an arts center, which was later stopped by an intervention from the Calcutta High Court. Nevertheless, substantial damage had already been done by then, and many graves were lost. The grave of Charles Stuart was destroyed (and was later restored) and the demolition of Derozio's grave had been initiated. In the early 2000s, a restoration project was launched to conserve the cemetery's heritage and prevent its further deterioration.

Notable tombs

Henry Louis Vivian Derozio (1809–1831), teacher and poet, pioneer of the Young Bengal movement
Sir William Jones (1746–1794), philologist and scholar, founder of the Asiatic Society
Lieutenant-General Sir John Clavering (c.1722–1777), army officer and diplomat
Augustus Cleveland (1754-1784), colonial administrator
Captain Edward Cooke (1772–1799), Royal Navy officer
George Bogle (1746–1781), diplomat
Colonel Robert Kyd (1746–1793), founder of the Indian Botanic Garden
 Lieutenant-Colonel Colin Mackenzie (1754–1821), Surveyor General of India
 Lieutenant-Colonel Valentine Blacker (1778-1826), Surveyor General of India
Sir John Hadley D'Oyly, 6th Baronet (1754–1818), politician
Major-General Charles Stuart (1758–1828), army officer and Indophile, popularly known as “Hindoo Stuart”
Walter Landor Dickens, son of English novelist Charles Dickens. He was buried initially in Bhowanipore war cemetery, and the tombstone was later moved here in 1987.
Grave no. 363 of an unknown woman (d. 1825) whose epitaph reads “A virtuous mother”.

Architecture
The cemetery is considered to be an important example of colonial-era architecture, with its Gothic-style tombs and monuments, mixed with the rich flavor of the Greek, Egyptian, and Indo-Saracenic styles. In certain instances, elements from Hindu architecture and Islamic tombs have also been adopted. Many of the monuments in the cemetery are adorned with intricate carvings, sculptures, and epitaphs. The structures are primarily constructed of sandstone, marble, and bricks, and feature a variety of shapes and sizes, ranging from simple headstones to grand mausoleums.

Gallery

References

Further reading
The South Park Street Cemetery, Calcutta, published by the Association for the Preservation of Historical Cemeteries in India, 5th ed. (2009)
BACSA. South Park Street Cemetery, Calcutta: Register of graves and standing tombs from 1767. London: British Association for Cemeteries in South Asia, 1992.
 Drost, Alexander, Tod und Erinnerung in der kolonialen Gesellschaft. Koloniale Sepulkralkultur in Bengalen (17.-19. Jahrhundert), Jena: Leander Wissenschaft, 2011. https://www.academia.edu/5444685

External links

The Great Cemetery of Asia

Cemeteries in India
Christianity in Kolkata
1767 establishments in India
1767 establishments in the British Empire